Brian Henry is an American poet, translator, editor, and literary critic.

Biography
Henry completed a B.A. at the College of William and Mary and an MFA Program for Poets & Writers at the University of Massachusetts Amherst.

He has published poetry in magazines including American Poetry Review, The Paris Review, Boston Review and Virginia Quarterly Review and his work has been translated into Russian, Croatian, Serbian, and Slovenian. Henry's poetry criticism has appeared in the publications including New York Times Book Review, the Times Literary Supplement, The Kenyon Review, The Georgia Review, and The Yale Review. His essays have been reprinted in such books as Imagining Australia (Harvard University Press).

Henry has translated Woods and Chalices (Harcourt, 2008) by the Slovenian poet Tomaž Šalamun and The Book of Things (BOA Editions, 2010) by the Slovenian poet Aleš Šteger. His translation of Book of Things won the 2011 Best Translated Book Award. In 2019 he was a contributor to A New Divan: A Lyrical Dialogue between East and West (Gingko Library).

Henry has taught at Plymouth State College and the University of Georgia. He currently teaches creative writing and literature at the University of Richmond. He lives in Richmond, Virginia.

Books
 Static & Snow (Black Ocean, 2015)
 Brother No One (Salt Publishing, 2013)
 Doppelganger (Talisman House, 2011)
 Lessness (Ahsahta Press, 2011)
 Wings Without Birds (Salt Publishing, 2010)
 In the Unlikely Event of a Water (Equipage, 2007)
 The Stripping Point (Counterpath Press, 2007)
 Quarantine (Ahsahta Press, 2006/ Arc Publications, 2009)
 Graft (New Issues Press/Arc Publications, 2003)
 American Incident (Salt Publishing, 2002)
 Astronaut (Carnegie Mellon University Press, 2002/ Arc Publications, 2000)
 The Verse Book of Interviews (co-ed.) (Verse Press, 2005)
 On James Tate (ed.) (University of Michigan Press, 2004)

Honors
 Best Translated Book Award, Book of Things, 2011
 Howard Foundation grant for Literary Translation, 2011
 National Endowment for the Arts Translation Grant, 2010
 Treci Trg Prize, Serbia, 2009
 Cecil B. Hemeley Memorial Award from the Poetry Society of America, 2008
 Alice Fay di Castagnola Award from the Poetry Society of America for Quarantine, 2003
 Carole Weinstein Poetry Prize, 2006
 George Bogin Memorial Award from the Poetry Society of America, 2001
 Finalist for the Forward Prize in England for Astronaut, 2000
 Fulbright Scholarship to Australia, 1997

External links
 University of Richmond page (faculty web page)
 "Poets and Writers interview"

1972 births
Living people
21st-century American poets
American male poets
American translators
College of William & Mary alumni
University of Massachusetts Amherst MFA Program for Poets & Writers alumni
21st-century American male writers